Marienburg Castle is a Gothic revival castle in Lower Saxony, Germany. It was also a summer residence of the House of Welf whose flag (in the colours of yellow and white) flies on the main tower.

History

The castle was built between 1858 and 1867 as a birthday present by King George V of Hanover (reigned 1851–1866) to his wife, Marie of Saxe-Altenburg. Between 1714 and 1837 there had been virtually no royal court in Hannover as the House of Hannover had ruled the kingdoms of Hannover and Britain by personal union, and so the Castle was also built to serve as a suitable summer seat for the House of Hannover in Germany, besides the Royal Leine Palace and Herrenhausen Palace in Hannover.

Its architect was Conrad Wilhelm Hase, one of Hannover's most influential architects. Due to Hannover's being annexed by Prussia in 1866, the castle was left uninhabited for 80 years after the royal family went into exile at Gmunden, Austria, where they lived in the Queen's Villa and, later, Cumberland Castle. Therefore, Marienburg is well preserved, as few renovations were done until 80 years later when it was safe to come back. Ernest Augustus, Duke of Brunswick and his wife Princess Viktoria Luise of Prussia moved to Marienburg in 1945, when forced to leave Blankenburg Castle. In 1954 their son, Prince Ernest Augustus IV, opened the castle museum after having moved to nearby Calenberg Demesne.

The castle today

The castle was owned by Prince Ernst August of Hanover, after his father signed it over to him in 2004, together with all other royal properties at Hanover and Gmunden. The castle housed the property management offices of the Royal House of Hanover and served as its official seat. Parts of it were open to the public, such as the castle museum, the restaurant, the chapel, and could be booked as an event location for weddings, receptions, concerts, etc. In 2010 the youth series In Your Dreams was filmed in the castle.

In 2014, the prince lent a number of paintings and objects to the Lower Saxony state exhibition When the Royals came from Hanover – The rulers of Hanover on England's throne, an exhibition taking place in five museums and castles, under the protectorate of HRH Charles, Prince of Wales. Of more than 1000 items, 30 had been contributed by HM the Queen, including the State Crown of George I, while Ernst August provided the king's famous Augsburg silver throne and other silver furniture of 1720, as well as the Hanoverian crown jewels. He hosted a parallel exhibition, The Way to the Crown, at Marienburg Castle until the end of 2016, showing, among other items such as the silver furniture, the crown jewels of the Kingdom of Hannover. On 6 July 2017 the prince hosted his wedding ball in the castle.

In November 2018, Prince Ernst August announced the transfer of ownership of the castle to the state of Lower Saxony, as its repair and maintenance costs were too great for him to sustain. Renovation costs of the castle, partly infested with dry rot and threatened by static problems, are estimated at 27 million Euros. He planned to transfer ownership to a state-controlled foundation (the Hanoverian Monasteries' Chamber, founded by his family in 1569, which still owns most of the secularized monasteries and ecclesiastical estates of the former kingdom), at a symbolic sales price of 1 Euro, with the foundation undertaking renovation. The remaining art collection was planned to be kept in the castle, with parts purchased by the state, parts kept by the family and lent to the state, and parts transferred to a foundation controlled by both the family and the state. The transaction however was stopped in spring 2019 by legal action taken by his father to regain ownership.

Gallery

References

External links

  
  

Castles in Lower Saxony
Kingdom of Hanover
Museums in Lower Saxony
Historic house museums in Germany